The 1974 Barking Borough Council election took place on 2 May 1974 to elect members of Barking London Borough Council in London, England. The whole council was up for election and the Labour Party stayed in overall control of the council.

Background
100 Candidates across 7 parties ran.
Labour was the only party that ran a full slate of candidates. The Conservative Party ran 25 candidates and the Liberal Party ran 11 candidates.

Results
Labour comfortably maintained its majority holding all of its seats. The Residents Association held all 4 of its Councillors.
Labour won 45 councillors to the Residents Association 4.

Results by ward

Abbey

Cambell

Chadwell Heath

Eastbrook

Fanshaw

Gascoigne

Heath

Longbridge

Manor

River

Valence

Village

By-elections between 1974 and 1978
There were no by-elections.

References

1974
1974 London Borough council elections